An Audience With the Cope 2000 is the sixteenth solo album by Julian Cope.

The album was originally released in 2000 as a "souvenir CD concert programme," provided to tie in with Cope's 2000 live concert tour. It contained a variety of material varying from psychedelic pop songs to space rock instrumentals. In 2001, the album was reissued with different artwork and a slightly altered title, An Audience With the Cope 2001, but an identical track listing.

Track listing 
 "The Glam Dicenn (Parts 1&2)" – 9:35 
 "Holy Mother of God" – 4:10 
 "Born To Breed" – 5:11
 "Ill Informer" – 10:10
 "The Glam Dicenn (Parts 3&4)" – 16:36 
 (Untitled hidden track) – 5:36

Note
Track 6 appears after 5 minutes of silence.

Personnel
Julian Cope – vocals, guitar, bass, mellotron, keyboards, production
Thighpaulsandra – synthesizer, piano, organ, engineer
Anthony "Doggen" Foster – guitar
Cliff Cheerio – synthesizer, cover photography
Kevin "Kevlar" Bales – drums
Technical
David Wrench – engineer
Terry Dobbin – engineer
Quinner – photography

References

External links
An Audience With The Cope on Discogs.com

2000 albums
Julian Cope albums